Mayiladuthurai block is a revenue block in the Mayiladuthurai taluk of Mayiladuthurai district, Tamil Nadu, India. There are a total of 54 panchayat villages in this block.

References 
 

Revenue blocks of Mayiladuthurai district